

Yalpara is a locality in the Australian state of South Australia located about  north of the state capital of Adelaide and about  north-east of the municipal seat in Orroroo.

Geography 
The boundaries of Yalpara were created on 16 December 1999 for the "long established name". This name is based on the Hundred of Yalpara, a cadastral division which has similar boundaries to the locality. The locality includes the site of the now-ceased Government Town of Brassey which was surveyed in June 1879 and "declared ceased to exist" on 24 February 1927.

Origin of the name 
The origin of the name Brassey is not known, Geoffrey Manning, the South Australian historian, suggests that "it was the name of an associate of Governor Jervois, the most likely candidate being Thomas Brassey (1805-1870), a railway contractor and an associate of Robert Stephenson."  The Hundred of Yalpara, which also contains a portion of the locality of Minburra was named after an unknown Aboriginal word.

The Yalpara Post Office, opened in December 1880 and closed on 30 April 1917, similarly Yalpara School opened in 1883 and closed in 1903.

Yalpara Station experienced flooding in December 1933.

Land use within the locality is "primary production" and is concerned with "agricultural production and the grazing of stock on relatively large holdings."  Some land in its south has been gazetted as a protected area known as the Yalpara Conservation Park.

The 2016 Australian census which was conducted in August 2016 reports that Yalpara had a population of 4 people.

Yalpara is located within the federal division of Grey, the state electoral district of Stuart and the local government area of the District Council of Orroroo Carrieton.

References
 

Towns in South Australia